Magta or Maguta may refer to:

 Magta people, or Ticuna, an ethnic group of the Amazon
 Magta language, or Ticuna, their language

See also 
 Magta-Lahjar, a town in Mauritania

Language and nationality disambiguation pages